Flexible carpooling is carpooling that is not arranged ahead of time, but instead makes use of designated meeting places.  It seeks to replicate the informal "slug-lines" that form in Washington DC, Houston, and San Francisco, by establishing more formal locations for travelers to form carpools without advance contact.

The essence of the systems is the use of a meeting-place to form carpools, without any advance contact between the participants.  For people wishing to carpool, going to a meeting place is a very low-effort method for getting into a carpool, compared with any other system that involves contacting potential riders or drivers in advance, and arranging the trip.  The key is that other people are also coming to the meeting place, and there need to be sufficient people traveling from any one meeting-place to the common destination so that the waiting time to form a carpool is acceptable.

The Transportation Research Board is carrying out research to determine the feasibility of 'flexible carpooling to transit stations'.  Since fewer people are carpooling today than were thirty years ago, the federal government, as well as local governments and the Department of Defense, are trying to reverse the decline.

It is estimated that San Francisco saves almost 1 million gallons of gasoline and associated emissions each year because of the operation of the informal flexible carpooling system.

Implementation 

From 1979 to 1980, Marin County, California, implemented a flexible carpooling system using as meeting points several major intersections near bus stops.

In 2009 the Washington State Legislature set aside $400,000 for a pilot project to test meeting-place based carpooling in the SR 520 corridor of Seattle.  This will incorporate the Avego smartphone ridematching system.

In 2010 the Auckland Regional Transport Authority considered a flexible carpooling proposal by Trip Convergence Ltd.

See also 

 Traditional carsharing and peer-to-peer carsharing allow access to automobiles for self-driven journeys.
 Carpool
 Hitchhiking
 Personal public transport
 Shared transport
 Slugging
 Sustainable transportation
 Trempiada
 Vanpool
 Ridesharing company

Notes and references 

Carsharing
Hitchhiking